The 2002 Intercontinental Cup was held in Havana, Cuba from November 8 through November 20, 2002.  Cuba defeated South Korea 2–1 in the final to win the tournament.

Intercontinental Cup (baseball)
Intercontinental Cup
International baseball competitions hosted by Cuba
Intercontinental Cup (baseball)
Baseball competitions in Havana
21st century in Havana